Andreas Reckwitz (18 March 1970 in Witten) is a German sociologist and cultural theorist. He is professor at the institute of social sciences at Humboldt University Berlin.

Life 
Reckwitz studied sociology, Political science and philosophy in Bonn, Hamburg and Cambridge. He graduated 1994 in Cambridge, overseen by Anthony Giddens. He achieved his Dr. phil. in 1999 at Hamburg University. From 2001 to 2005 he worked there as assistant professor at the sociological faculty. In 2005 he became professor for sociology and sociology of culture at Konstanz University, 2010 professor for sociology of culture at the Viadrina European University in Frankfurt (Oder). In 2020 Reckwitz became professor for sociology and sociology of culture at Humboldt University in Berlin.

Reckwitz is a prominent proponent of social practice theory and contributed to its development as an encompassing social and cultural theory. This serves as basis for his works on subjectivation, creativity and singularization of the social life.

In 2017 he published his work on the structure of the current late modern society, Die Gesellschaft der Singularitäten. Zum Strukturwandel der Moderne, which was published in English in 2020 as The Society of Singularities. In this book he analyses how economy, work, information technology, lifestyle, classes and politics follow a system which values singularity and devalues non-singularity.

Reckwitz wrote several articles for the newspaper Die Zeit and appeared as an interview partner on the German national radio Deutschlandfunk Kultur discussing current socio-cultural and political trends and issues in western societies.

In 2019 Reckwitz was awarded the Gottfried Wilhelm Leibniz Prize of the German Research Foundation.

Selected publications 
 The Society of Singularities. Polity, Cambridge 2020.
 Translated from Die Gesellschaft der Singularitäten. Zum Strukturwandel der Moderne. Suhrkamp, Berlin 2017, 
 The End of Illusions: Politics, Economics and Culture in Late Modernity. Polity, Cambridge 2021.
 Translated from Das Ende der Illusionen. Politik, Ökonomie und Kultur in der Spätmoderne. Suhrkamp, Berlin 2019. .
 Kreativität und soziale Praxis. Studien zur Sozial- und Gesellschaftstheorie. transcript, Bielefeld 2016,  (collected articles).
 The Invention of Creativity. Modern Society and the Culture of the New, Polity, Cambridge 2017, .
 Translated from Die Erfindung der Kreativität. Zum Prozess gesellschaftlicher Ästhetisierung. Suhrkamp, Berlin 2012,  
 Unscharfe Grenzen. Perspektiven der Kultursoziologie. transcript, Bielefeld 2008, .
 Subjekt. transcript, Bielefeld 2008, .
 Das hybride Subjekt. Eine Theorie der Subjektkulturen von der bürgerlichen Moderne zur Postmoderne. Velbrück Wissenschaft, Weilerswist 2006, . (habilitation dissertation)
 Die Transformation der Kulturtheorien. Zur Entwicklung eines Theorieprogramms. Velbrück Wissenschaft, Weilerswist 2000, .
 Struktur. Zur sozialwissenschaftlichen Analyse von Regeln und Regelmäßigkeiten. Westdeutscher Verlag, Opladen/ Wiesbaden 1997, .

As editor
 with Sophia Prinz and Hilmar Schäfer: Ästhetik und Gesellschaft. Suhrkamp, Berlin 2015, .
 with Stephan Moebius: Poststrukturalistische Sozialwissenschaften. Suhrkamp, Frankfurt am Main 2008, .
 with Thorsten Bonacker: Kulturen der Moderne. Soziologische Perspektiven der Gegenwart. Campus Verlag, Frankfurt am Main/ New York 2007, .
 with Holger Sievert: Interpretation, Konstruktion, Kultur. Ein Paradigmenwechsel in den Sozialwissenschaften. Westdeutscher Verlag, Opladen/ Wiesbaden 1999, .

References

Living people
1970 births
People from Witten
German sociologists
Gottfried Wilhelm Leibniz Prize winners
Academic staff of the University of Konstanz
Academic staff of European University Viadrina
Academic staff of the Humboldt University of Berlin
University of Bonn alumni
Alumni of the University of Cambridge
University of Hamburg alumni